West Virginia Route 15 is an east–west state highway in the central portion of the U.S. state of West Virginia. The western terminus of the route is at West Virginia Route 4 northeast of Sutton, Braxton County. The eastern terminus is at U.S. Route 219 and West Virginia Route 55 in Valley Head, Randolph County.

Major intersections

References

015
West Virginia Route 015
West Virginia Route 015
West Virginia Route 015